Albin Molnár (2 June 1935 – 16 May 2022) was a Hungarian sailor. He competed in the Flying Dutchman event at the 1960 Summer Olympics.

References

External links
 
 

1935 births
2022 deaths
Hungarian male sailors (sport)
Olympic sailors of Hungary
Sailors at the 1960 Summer Olympics – Flying Dutchman
Sportspeople from Budapest